Vladimir Viktorovich Aksyonov (Russian: Влади́мир Ви́кторович Аксёнов) is a former Soviet cosmonaut.

Aksyonov was born in Giblitsy in the Kasimovsky District, Ryazan Oblast, Russian SFSR, on February 1, 1935.

Education and Career 
Aksyonov graduated from the Institute of Engineering with a diploma from the Air Force Institute called Polytechnical Institute. He was a candidate for technical science.

Aksyonov was selected to be a cosmonaut on March 3, 1973. He flew as Flight Engineer on Soyuz 22 and Soyuz T-2. He was awarded the title of Hero of the Soviet Union on two occasions. He retired on October 17, 1988.

Aksyonov is currently the director of the institute for research of Russian mineral resources. He is married and has two children.

Honours and awards
 "Gold Star" Hero of the Soviet Union, twice (1976, 1980)
 Two Orders of Lenin (1976, 1980)
 Medal "For Merit in Space Exploration" (12 April 2011) - for the great achievements in the field of research, development and utilization of outer space, many years of diligent work, public activities
 Medal "Veteran of Labour"
 Gold medal "For services to science and humanity" (Czechoslovakia)
 Order of Karl Marx (East Germany, 13 October 1976)
 Pilot-Cosmonaut of the USSR
 Honoured Master of Sports
 Honorary Citizen of Ryazan

References

1935 births
Soviet cosmonauts
Soviet aerospace engineers
Heroes of the Soviet Union
Recipients of the Order of Lenin
Recipients of the Medal "For Merit in Space Exploration"
People from Kasimovsky District
Living people
Salyut program cosmonauts